The following lists events that happened during 1947 in the Union of Soviet Socialist Republics.

Incumbents
 General Secretary of the Communist Party of the Soviet Union – Joseph Stalin
 Chairman of the Presidium of the Supreme Soviet of the Soviet Union – Nikolay Shvernik
 Chairman of the Council of Ministers of the Soviet Union – Joseph Stalin

Births
 January 8 – Igor Ivanov, Russian-born Canadian grandmaster (died 2005)
 October 12 – Zukhra Valeeva, Russian master builder

Deaths
 August 9 – Seraphima Blonskaya

See also
 1947 in fine arts of the Soviet Union
 List of Soviet films of 1947

References

 
Soviet Union
Soviet Union
Soviet Union